Baka is a village and municipality in the Dunajská Streda District in the Trnava Region of south-west Slovakia.

It has a football club, the FC BAKA.

Geography
The municipality lies at an altitude of 115 metres and covers an area of 19.989 km². It has a population of about 1130 people.

History
In the 9th century, the territory of Baka became part of the Kingdom of Hungary.
In historical records the village was first mentioned in 1264.
After the Austro-Hungarian army disintegrated in November 1918, Czechoslovak troops occupied the area, later acknowledged internationally by the Treaty of Trianon. Between 1938 and 1945 Baka once more became part of Miklós Horthy's Hungary through the First Vienna Award. From 1945 until the Velvet Divorce, it was part of Czechoslovakia. Since then it has been part of Slovakia.

Genealogical resources

The records for genealogical research are available at the state archive "Statny Archiv in Bratislava, Slovakia"
 Roman Catholic church records (births/marriages/deaths): 1676-1728 (parish B), 1728-1908 (parish A)
 Reformated church records (births/marriages/deaths): 1854-1896
 Census records 1869 of Baka are not available at the state archive.

See also
 List of municipalities and towns in Slovakia

References

External links
FC Baka website 
Surnames of living people in Baka

Villages and municipalities in Dunajská Streda District
Hungarian communities in Slovakia